Alfonso García may refer to:
 Alfonso García (athlete)
 Alfonso García (judoka)
 Alfonso Garcia (footballer)
 Alfonso García González, Mexican politician